Aleksandr Ryazankin (Russian: Александр Рязанкин; born 21 July 1949) is a Soviet rower.

Ryazankin was born in 1949. At the 1970 World Rowing Championships in St. Catharines, he won silver with the men's eight. He competed at the 1972 Summer Olympics in Munich with the men's eight where they came fourth. At the 1973 European Rowing Championships in Moscow, he was with the men's eight that won bronze.

References

External links 
 

1949 births
Living people
Soviet male rowers
Olympic rowers of the Soviet Union
Rowers at the 1972 Summer Olympics
World Rowing Championships medalists for the Soviet Union
European Rowing Championships medalists